Mashallah, also written Masha'Allah, Maşallah (Turkey and Azerbaijan), Masya Allah (Malaysia and Indonesia) and Mašallah (Bosnia and Herzegovina), is an Arabic phrase that is used to express a feeling of awe or beauty regarding an event or person that was just mentioned. It is a common expression used throughout the Muslim world and among non-Muslim Arabs to mean, in its literal sense, that "God has willed it [has happened]".

Etymology
The literal English translation is "God has willed it", the present perfect of God's will accentuating the essential Islamic doctrine of predestination.

The literal meaning of Mashallah is "God has willed it", in the sense of "what God has willed has happened"; it is used to say something good has happened, used in the past tense. Inshallah, literally "if God has willed", is used similarly but to refer to a future event.

Other uses
"Masha Allah" can be used to congratulate someone. It is a reminder that although the person is being congratulated, ultimately God willed it. In some cultures, people may utter Masha Allah in the belief that it may help protect them from jealousy, the evil eye or a jinn. The phrase has also found its way into the colloquial language of many non-Arab languages with predominantly Muslim speakers, including Indonesians, Malaysians, Persians, Turks, Kurds, Bosniaks, Azerbaijanis, Somalis, Chechens, Avars, Circassians, Bangladeshis, Tatars, Albanians, Uzbeks, Kazakhs, Turkmens, Tajiks, Afghans, Pakistanis, and others.

It is also used by some Christians and others in areas which were ruled by the Ottoman Empire: Serbs, Romanians, Christian Albanians, Bulgarians and Macedonians say "машала" ("mašala"), often in the sense of "a job well done"; also some Georgians, Armenians, Bosnian Croats, Pontic Greeks (descendants of those that came from the Pontus region), Cypriot Greeks and Sephardi Jews.

See also
 Inshallah
 Tasbih
 Tahmid
 Tahlil
 Takbir
 Dhikr
 As-Salamu Alaykum
 Alayhi as-Salam
 Salawat
 B'ezrat Hashem
 Mazel tov
 Deo volente
Mongrall

References

Arabic words and phrases
Islamic terminology

IMPORTANT
Do not say mashallah with only one a, as the "Masha" is a singular word, and "Allah" means god. In other words where the word "Allah", as seen in the word "mashallah" treat it as another word (Masha Allah)
"Mashallah" with only one "A" means "God walked"